Cereopsius javanicus is a species of beetle in the family Cerambycidae. It was described by Stephan von Breuning in 1936. It is known from Borneo and Java.

References

Cereopsius
Beetles described in 1936